Don Khun Wiset Halt was a railway station on the Suphanburi Line, located in Tambon Huai Mon Thong, Amphoe Kamphaeng San, Nakhon Pathom Province, Thailand. The station was changed from a station to a halt on March 1, 1977. There was only one platform, 200 metres in length. No trains now stop at the station.

References

External links
 Rotfaithai Dot Com 

Defunct railway stations in Thailand
Railway stations closed in 1977